Vítor Manuel Fernandes Murta (born 21 July 1979) is a Portuguese former professional footballer who played as a goalkeeper.

Football career
Born in Vila Real, Murta began his career in the third tier with hometown club S.C. Vila Real and S.C. Freamunde, before stepping up to the second with Gondomar S.C. in 2005. He remained at that level in 2008, when he joined F.C. Vizela.

In 2010, Murta signed for Gil Vicente FC, who ended the season as champions of the second division; he played just 11 games of 30 but was only used one fewer time than first-choice Jorge Baptista. He made his Primeira Liga debut at age 32 on 18 February 2012, as a half-time substitute for Adriano Facchini in a 3–0 home loss to S.C. Braga. He played seven more times for the club from Barcelos the following season, and was sent off in the last game on 19 May 2013 in a 3–1 home loss to G.D. Estoril-Praia for conceding a penalty.

After a year at A.D. Oliveirense, Murta moved across the third tier to F.C. Famalicão in 2014. His first season at the club ended in promotion, despite a penalty shootout defeat to C.D. Mafra in the final on 10 June 2015.

From 2016, Murta returned to the third tier with C.D. Trofense, Oliveirense again, and Mondinense FC.

References

External links

1979 births
Living people
People from Vila Real, Portugal
Portuguese footballers
Association football goalkeepers
Primeira Liga players
Liga Portugal 2 players
Segunda Divisão players
S.C. Freamunde players
Gondomar S.C. players
F.C. Vizela players
Gil Vicente F.C. players
AD Oliveirense players
F.C. Famalicão players
C.D. Trofense players
Sportspeople from Vila Real District